Petersburg station (also known as Ettrick station) is an Amtrak railroad station located at 3516 South Street in Ettrick, Virginia just outside the city of Petersburg. However, like most of Ettrick, it has a Petersburg address. The station was built in 1955 by the Atlantic Coast Line Railroad (ACL) and services nearby Virginia State University and its home field, Rogers Stadium, both a short walk from the station.

History

In the 1970s Amtrak also served Union Station in Petersburg until Mountaineer service east–west across Virginia ended in 1977.

In the 2010s a replacement station was proposed in Colonial Heights to serve the Tri-Cities of Petersburg, Colonial Heights, and Hopewell. Those plans were shelved as of July 2019, when the Commonwealth Transportation Board reported that $5.7 million had been secured for modernizing the station including replacement of the passenger platform and connecting ramps, as well as improving the parking lot, access road, and signs on Interstate 95.

In 2019 bus service began to the multi-modal station in downtown Petersburg, with a park-and-ride lot under construction.

An additional daily Northeast Regional round trip was added on July 11, 2022, increasing Norfolk service through Petersburg to three weekday round trips and two weekend round trips.

Proposed future

Petersburg's role as a passenger rail transfer station would grow under the Southeast High Speed Rail Corridor project, which includes high-speed service to both Norfolk, Virginia, and Raleigh, North Carolina. A shorter route to Raleigh is in the works, with the acquisition of CSX abandoned right-of-way and underused trackage.

Services
Petersburg station is served by five Amtrak routes: Northeast Regional, Carolinian, Palmetto, Silver Star, and Silver Meteor.

References

External links 

Great American Stations (Amtrak)
Petersburg Amtrak Station (USA Rail Guide - Train Web)

Transportation in Petersburg, Virginia
Amtrak stations in Virginia
P
Buildings and structures in Chesterfield County, Virginia